Anheuser-Busch InBev SA/NV (abbreviated as AB InBev) is the largest beer company in the world. It had 200 brands prior to the merger with SABMiller on October 10, 2016. The combined ABInBev/SAB Miller entity has approximately 400 beer brands as of January 2017.

The original InBev global brands are Budweiser, Corona and Stella Artois. Its international brands are Beck's, Hoegaarden and Leffe. The rest are categorized as local brands. Many other brands were gained as a result of the merger with SABMiller.

The estimated annual sales for the company in 2017 will be US$55 billion; prior to the merger, ABInBev had realized US$43.6 billion in revenue in 2015. The company is expected to have an estimated global market share of 28 percent, according to Euromonitor International.

Brands

Global

 Budweiser
 Bud Dry
 Bud Extra
 Bud Lime
 Budweiser Black Crown
 Bud Light
 Bud Light Chelada
 Bud Light Lime
 Busch
 Busch Light
 Corona
 Corona Extra
 Corona Light
 Estrella
 Modelo Especial
 Modelo Light
 Negra Modelo
 Pacífico
 Victoria
 Natural Light
 Natural Ice
 Shock Top Belgian White
 Peeterman Artois
 Stella Artois
 Artois Bock
 Ziegenbock

Europe

 Beck's (Germany)
 Beck's Dark
 Beck's Alkoholfrei
 Beck's Oktoberfest
 Beck's Premier Light
 Brouwerij Bosteels (Belgium)
 Pauwel Kwak
 Tripel Karmeliet
 Breda (The Channel Islands) Still Available
 Camden Town Brewery (UK)
 Diekirch (Luxembourg)
 Diekirch Grand Cru
 Diekirch Grande Réserve
 Diekirch Exclusive
 Dimix (Germany)
 Dommelsch (Netherlands)
 Dommelsch Pilsener
 Dommelsch Ice
 Dommelsch Dominator
 Ginette (Belgium)
 Gilde Ratskeller (Germany)
 Haake-Beck (Germany)
 Hasseröder (Germany)
 Hertog Jan (Netherlands)
 Primator
 Oud Bruin
 Grand Prestige
 Tripel
 Dubbel
 Winterbier
 Bockbier
 Meibock
  Hoegaarden (Belgium)
 Hougaerdse Das
 Hop Hound Amber Wheat
 Julius (Belgium)
 Jupiler (Belgium)
 Jupiler N.A.
 Jupiler Blue
 Jupiler Tauro
 Klinskoye (Russia)
 Klinskoye Svetloye
 Klinskoye Zolotoye
 Klinskoye Luxik
 Klinskoye Redkoye
 Klinskoye Arriva
 Klinskoye Samurai
 La Bécasse (France)
 La Bécasse Kriek
 La Bécasse Raspberry
 La Bécasse Gueuze
 Leffe (Belgium)
 Leffe Brown
 Leffe Blonde
 Leffe Ruby 
 Leffe Printemps
 Löwenbräu (Germany)
 Löwenbräu Alkoholfrei
 Löwenbräu Dunkel
 Löwenbräu Löwen Weisse
 Löwenbräu Original
 Löwenbräu Oktoberfestbier
 Löwenbräu Premium Pils 
 Löwenbräu Radler
 Löwenbräu Schwarze Weisse
 Löwenbräu Triumphator
 Löwenbräu Urtyp
 Mousel (Luxembourg)
 Noroc (Romania)
 Permskoye Gubernskoye (Russia)
 Permskoye Gubernskoye Svetloye
 Piedboeuf (Belgium)
 Piedboeuf Blond
 Piedboeuf Brown
 Piedboeuf Triple
 Red Bridge (Luxembourg)
 Rifey (Russia)
 Rohan (Ukraine)
Rohan Lehke
Rohan Tradytsiyne
Rohan Monastyrske Temne
Rohan Veselyi Monach
Rohan Bezalkoholne
 Safir (Belgium)
 Sibirskaya Korona (Siberian Crown)(Russia)
 Spaten (Germany)
 Spaten Alkoholfrei
 Spaten Diät-Pils
 Spaten Münchner Hell
 Spaten Oktoberfestbier
 Spaten Optimator
 Spaten Pils
 St. Pauli Girl (Germany)
 St. Pauli Girl Lager
 St. Pauli Girl Special Dark
 St. Pauli Girl Non-Alcoholic
 Taller (Ukraine)
 Tinkov Russian Lager (Russia)
 Tolstiak (Russia)
 Tolstiak Dobroye
 Tolstiak Svetloye
 Tolstiak Zaboristoye
 Tolstiak Krepkoye
 Tolstiak Grechisnoye
 Victoria, strong blond Belgian beer (Belgium)
 Vieux Temps (Belgium)
 Wild Series
 Wild Blue
 Wild Black
 Wild Red
 Whitbread (United Kingdom) (purchased from Whitbread Group plc in 2001)
 Yantar (Ukraine)

Asia / Pacific

 Baisha (China)
 Beck's Ice (India)
 Boxing Cat (China)
 Cafri (South Korea)
 Cascade Brewery (Australia)
 Cass (South Korea)
 Cass Fresh
 Cass Light
 Cass Red
 Cass Lemon
 Cass Beats
 Double Deer (China)
 E-Generation
 Premium Light
 Dry Beer
 Foster's (Australia)
 Great Northern Brewing Co. (Australia)
 GuoGuang (China)
 Haywards 5000 (India)
 Jinlin (China)
 Jinlongquan (China)
 Draft
 Refreshing
 Kaiba (China)
 KK (China)
 Nanchang (China)
 OB (South Korea)
 Red Shiliang (China)
 Santai (China)
 Sedrin (China)
 Southern Bay brew hole
 The Hand & Malt (South Korea)
 Yali (China)
 Zizhulin (China)
 Zhujiang (China)

Americas

 10 Barrel Brewing Co (USA)
 911 (Dominican Republic)
 Alexander Keith's (Canada)
 Keith's IPA
 Keith's White
 Keith's Dark
 Keith's Red
 Keith's Light
 Keith's Regular
 Keith's Hop Series
 Andes (Argentina)
 Antarctica (Brazil)
 Aqua Fratelli Vita (Brazil)
 Babe Wines
 Banded Peak (Canada)
 Baviera (Paraguay)
 Best Damn Brewing Company
 Best Damn Root Beer
 Best Damn Apple Ale
 Blue Point Brewing Company (USA)
 Blue Star (Canada)
 Bogotá Beer Company (Colombia)
 Bohemia (Brazil)
 Bohemia Pilsen
 Bohemia Escura
 Bohemia Weiss
 Bohemia Royal Ale
 Bohemia Confraria
 Bohemia Oaken
 Bohemia (Dominican Republic)
 Bohemia Light (Dominican Republic)
 Brahma 
 Brahva Gold (Guatemala)
 Brahva Beats (Guatemala)
 Breckenridge Brewery (USA)
 Budweiser
 Budweiser Chelada
 Bud Dry
 Bud Extra
 Bud Ice
 Bud Ice Light
 Bud Lime
 Budweiser American Ale
 Budweiser Black Crown
 Budweiser Freedom Reserve
 Budweiser Magnum
 Budweiser Select
 Budweiser Select 55
 Bud Light
 Bud Light Chelada
 Bud Light Golden Wheat
 Bud Light Lime
 Bud Light Orange
 Bud Light Platinum
 Caracu (Brazil)
 Cervecería Boliviana Nacional (Bolivia)
 Bi-Cervecina El Inca
 Ducal
 Huari
 Maltín
 Paceña
 Paceña Centenario
 Taquiña
 Cervecería Nacional (Panamá)
 Atlas
 Atlas Golden Light
 Balboa
 Balboa Ice
 Malta Vigor 
 Cervejaria Colorado (Brazil)
 Cervecerias Chile (Chile)
 Cervejaria Wäls (Brazil)
 Báltica (Chile)
 Becker (Chile)
 Cusqueña (Peru) 
 Devils Backbone Brewing Company (USA)
 Elysian Brewing Company (USA)
 Four Peaks (USA)
 Golden Road (USA)
 Goose Island Brewery (USA)
 Grupo Modelo (Mexico) Acquired in 2013
 Barrilito
 Corona Cero
 Corona Extra 
 Corona Ligera
 Corona Light 
 Cervecería Bocanegra
 Cervecería Cucapá
 Cervecería de Tijuana
 León
 Modelo Ámbar 
 Modelo Especial
 Modelo Noche Especial
 Modelo Trigo
 Montejo
 Negra Modelo
 Pacifico Clara
 Pacifico Light 
 Pacifico Suave 
 Vicky Chamoy
 Vicky Chelada
 Victoria
 Victoria Ligera
 Índica (Uruguay)
 Karbach Brewing Company (USA)
 Kokanee (Canada)
 Kokanee
 Kokanee Gold
 Kokanee Light
 Kokanee Frost
 Kootenay True Ale
 Labatt Family (Canada) Acquired in 1995
 Labatt Blue 
 Labatt Blue Dry
 Labatt Blue Light 
 Labatt Club
 Labatt .5
 Labatt Lite
 Labatt Lucky Lager
 Labatt 50
 John Labatt Classic
 Labatt Genuine
 Labatt Extra Dry Lager
 Labatt Wildcat
 Labatt Ice
 Jockey Club 
 Blue Star
NOTE: The U.S. version of Labatt is distributed by North American Breweries due to antitrust issues.
 Lakeport Family (Canada) Acquired in 2007
Lakeport Pilsener
Lakeport Honey Lager
Lakeport Strong
Lakeport Ice 
Lakeport Ale
Lakeport Light
Lakeport Red
Steeler
Brava
Wee Willy
 Liber (Brazil)
 Marathon (Brazil)
 Michelob
 Michelob Light
 Michelob Honey Lager
 Michelob Honey Wheat
 Michelob Pale Ale
 Michelob Ultra
 Mill Street Brewery (Canada)
 Malta Morena (Dominican Republic)
 Norteña (Uruguay)
 Oceánica (Uruguay)
 Oland Export Ale (Canada)
 Original (Brazil)
 Patagonia (Argentina)
 Patricia (Uruguay)
 Pilsen (Paraguay)
 Pilsen Ñande (Paraguay)
 Pilsen Ñande Roja
 Pilsen Ñande Blanca
 Pilsen Ñande Negra
 Pilsener (Ecuador)
 Pilsener Light (Ecuador)
 Presidente Light (Dominican Republic)
 Presidente Black (Dominican Republic)
 Quilmes (Argentina)
 Ron Barceló (Dominican Republic)
 Schooner Lager (Canada)
 Serramalte (Brazil)
 Spiked Seltzer (USA)
 Sukita (Brazil)
 Turning Point (Canada)
 Stanley Park
 Hell's Gate
 Veza Sur Brewing Company  (USA)
 Wicked Weed (USA)

Africa 
 South African Breweries (SAB)
 Brutal fruit
 Black Crown
 Carling Black Label
 Carver's Weis
 Castle Lager
 Castle Lite
 Castle Milk Stout
 Castle Free
 Corona
 Flying Fish
 Flying Fish Chill
 Hansa Pilsner
 Liberado
 Newlands Spring
 Redds
Cervejas De Moçambique (CDM)
2M
2M Flow
Manica
Laurentina 
Laurentina Premium 
Laurentina Preta 
Laurentina Clara
Impala(cassava-based beer)  
Dourada

Services and Products 

SmartBarley: a tech collaboration with Sentera
100+ Accelerator: an accelerator program for startups

References

AB InBev